Neil Hamburger Pays Tribute to Diana, Princess of Wales 1962-1997 is the name of a 1997 EP by alternative comedian Neil Hamburger. It was released by Planet Pimp Records in 1997.  "Zipper Shtick 97" recorded on stage in Melbourne, Australia, for live simulcast on the 3RRR-FM radio program "Paint the Town Clear Gloss." The cover of the record is factually incorrect, as Princess Diana was born in 1961, rather than 1962.

Track listing

"Zipper Shtick '97" (4:11)
"International Funnyman" (3:28)

References
 

Gregg Turkington albums
1997 EPs
Memorials to Diana, Princess of Wales